Auguste Caby (6 October 1887 - 15 February 1915) was a French freestyle swimmer. He competed in the 1500 m event at the 1912 Summer Olympics, but failed to reach the final.

References

1887 births
1915 deaths
Sportspeople from Beauvais
French male freestyle swimmers
Swimmers at the 1912 Summer Olympics
Olympic swimmers of France